Isurichthys is an extinct genus of prehistoric ray-finned fish, belonging to the family Ariommatidae.

Species
Three species have been classified within the genus Isurichthys:

I. orientalis was reclassified by A.F. Bannikov as Rybapina orientalis in 2018, although this appears to have not been generally accepted.

References

Prehistoric perciform genera